Grane may:

Places
Grane, Nordland, a municipality in Nordland county, Norway
Grane Church, a church in Grane, Norway
Grâne, Drôme, a commune in Drôme, France
Grane, an old name for Kuwait
Grane (river), a river in Lower Saxony, Germany
Grane Dam, a river dam in Langelsheim, Lower Saxony, Germany
Grane oil field, an oil field in the North Sea
Grane Oil Pipeline, an oil pipeline system in Western Norway

Other
Grani, the horse of Sigurd in Norse mythology, rendered as Grane for the horse of Brynhildr (Brünnhilde) in Der Ring des Nibelungen by Richard Wagner.